Jorge Dideiro Payret Zubiaur (born circa 1939) is a Cuban Communist politician, diplomat and professor in political science at the University of Havana. 

Payret has worked for the Cuban foreign department since 1968 and has been Cuba's ambassador to Sweden from 2002 to 2006. He has been Cuba's ambassador to the Federation of St. Kitts and Nevis since 2009. He speaks Spanish, English and Swedish.

References
 https://web.archive.org/web/20040925130356/http://www.cubanuestra.nu/web/article.asp?artID=1826
 http://www.cubanuestra.nu/web/article.asp?artID=7287
 http://granma.co.cu/2009/01/30/nacional/artic06.html
 http://www.zizonline.com/news/?FFF532DC-2219-22DB-AB2E3E7A432E342C

Living people
1939 births
Communist Party of Cuba politicians
Ambassadors of Cuba to Sweden
Ambassadors of Cuba to Saint Kitts and Nevis